Tanycyttara is a monotypic genus of Australian moths in the family Gelechiidae containing the sole species Tanycyttara xanthomochla, which is found in Australia, where it has been recorded from Queensland.

The wingspan is about 15 mm. The forewings are pale yellow with the dorsal area suffused with fuscous and with a fuscous streak from the base along the fold to the tornus and a fuscous costal streak from the base to the middle, its apex connected by an oblique streak with a dark fuscous V-shaped mark resting on the tornus. There is also a broad dark fuscous marginal line on the posterior one-fourth of the costa and tornus. The hindwings are pale grey.

References

Gelechiinae